Árni Þór Sigurðsson (born 30 July 1960) is an Icelandic diplomat and former member of the Althing. He is currently serving as Iceland's Ambassador to the Russian Federation, also accredited to Armenia, Azerbaijan, Belarus, Kazakhstan, Kyrgyzstan, Moldova, Tajikistan, Turkmenistan, and Uzbekistan.

Career
Árni Þór received a cand.mag. degree in Economics and Russian from the University of Oslo in 1986 and subsequently pursued graduate studies in Slavic languages at the University of Stockholm and the University of Moscow. He received a master's degree in international relations from the University of Iceland in 2015.

From the early 1990s until his election to the Althing in 2007, he served in various roles at the Icelandic Teachers' Union, the Icelandic Ports Association, and on the Reykjavík City Council.

At the Althing, Árni Þór represented Reykjavík Constituency North as a member of the Left-Green Movement until 2014. He served on a variety of committees and chaired the Foreign Affairs Committee from 2009 to 2013 and the Parliamentary Delegation to European Free Trade Association from 2009 to 2013. He co-chaired the Iceland-EU Joint Parliamentary Committee and was a delegate to the Nordic Council from 2010 to 2013 where he chaired the Standing Committee of Culture and Education. He was Deputy Speaker of the Althing twice in 2009-2010 and 2012–2013. He was chair, vice-chair, or acting chair of the Left-Green Movement's parliamentary group from 2009 to 2012.

Árni Þór was appointed to the Icelandic foreign service in 2014. From 2015 he was Ambassador for Arctic Affairs, representing Iceland in the Arctic Council and from 2018 he was Iceland's Ambassador to Finland, also accredited to Estonia, Latvia, Lithuania, and Ukraine. He became Ambassador to Russia in 2020.

He has been decorated a Commander of the Grand Cross of the Order of the Lion of Finland.

Klaustur Affair

During the Klaustur Affair, it was revealed that Gunnar Bragi Sveinsson had appointed Árni Þór as an ambassador in order to draw attention away from Geir Haarde, whose simultaneous appointment was a political favour to the Independence Party.

Árni Þór responded with a public statement emphasizing that his experience made him a good candidate for the role.

Personal life
Árni Þór was born in Reykjavík. He and his wife Sigurbjörg Þorsteinsdóttir have three children.

References

External links
Althing biography
Photos Arni Thor Sigurdsson: International Cooperation

Living people
1960 births
Arni Thor Sigurdsson
Arni Thor Sigurdsson
Arni Thor Sigurdsson
Recipients of the Order of the Lion of Finland
Árni Þór Sigurðsson
Árni Þór Sigurðsson
Árni Þór Sigurðsson
Árni Þór Sigurðsson
Árni Þór Sigurðsson
Árni Þór Sigurðsson
Árni Þór Sigurðsson
Árni Þór Sigurðsson
Árni Þór Sigurðsson
Árni Þór Sigurðsson
Árni Þór Sigurðsson
Árni Þór Sigurðsson
Árni Þór Sigurðsson
Árni Þór Sigurðsson
Árni Þór Sigurðsson
Árni Þór Sigurðsson